The first USS Porpoise was a topsail schooner in the United States Navy.

Porpoise was built in 1820 at the Portsmouth Navy Yard, Kittery, Maine.

She first cruised in the West Indies in 1821–1823, Lieutenant James Ramage in command, hunting pirates.

Cruising the West African coast in 1824–25, the schooner engaged in the suppression of the slave trade. Late in 1825 she returned to the United States and, under Commander Foxhall A. Parker, Sr., cruised off the northeast coast of the United States.

Porpoise cruised the Mediterranean from 1826 until 1830 under the command of Lts. Benjamin Cooper, John H. Bell, and Thomas M. Newell successively. Returning to the West Indies in 1830, she sailed under Lts. John Percival, James Armstrong, and James McIntosh.

While cruising in the West Indies in 1833 under the command of Lt. William Taylor, Porpoise was wrecked on a reef off Point Lizardo.

References

Schooners of the United States Navy
Ships built in Kittery, Maine
Shipwrecks in the Caribbean Sea
1820 ships
Maritime incidents in 1833